Kähler may refer to:

People
Alexander Kähler (born 1960), German television journalist
Birgit Kähler (born 1970), German high jumper
Erich Kähler (1906–2000), German mathematician
Heinz Kähler (1905–1974), German art historian and archaeologist
Luise Kähler (1869–1955), German trade union leader and politician
Martin Kähler (1835–1912), German theologian
Otto Kähler (1894–1967), German admiral
Wilhelmine Kähler (1864–1941), German politician

Other
 Kähler Keramik, a Danish ceramics manufacturer
Kähler manifold, an important geometric complex manifold

See also
Kahler (disambiguation)

Occupational surnames